Shuckstack is a mountain in the Great Smoky Mountains of Swain County, North Carolina, in the southeastern United States.

A historic fire tower stands at the summit of Shuckstack, offering a panoramic view of the western Smokies, Yellow Creek, Unicoi, Cheoah, and northern Nantahala mountains. Although no longer in use, the fire tower is accessible to the public. The summit of Shuckstack is accessed via the Appalachian Trail and a short spur trail.

Along with the fire tower, the summit of Shuckstack also hosts the chimney, foundation, and cistern of what was once a fire watchman's cabin along with several outcroppings of Precambrian Ocoee Supergroup sandstone.

References

External links 
 Great Smoky Mountains National Park Trail Map - Large file in .pdf format.
 Shuckstack Tower Trail - Article in the Knoxville News-Sentinel, 11/02/2003.
 North Carolina Fire Lookouts - List of fire lookouts in the state of North Carolina.
 Tennessee/GSMNP fire towers
 Help restore Shuckstack more photos and history

Mountains of Great Smoky Mountains National Park
Mountains on the Appalachian Trail
Mountains of North Carolina
Protected areas of Swain County, North Carolina
Mountains of Swain County, North Carolina